Saints Firmus and Rusticus (died c. 290 AD) are venerated as two martyrs of Verona.  Their unreliable Acts state that Firmus and Rusticus, kinsmen, were prominent citizens of Bergamo.  They were martyred at Verona under the Emperor Maximian after refusing to sacrifice to pagan idols. Under the judge Anolinus, they were tortured, beaten with clubs, 
and beheaded. 

It has been postulated that Firmus and Rusticus were actually two martyrs of Africa whose relics were translated to Verona. Their Acts were written to make them heroes of Verona instead. Their feast day is celebrated on August 9.

Gallery

References

External links
Dominican Martyrology

290 deaths
Saints from Roman Italy
Sibling duos
Saints duos
3rd-century Christian martyrs
Year of birth unknown
Year of death uncertain